Adolescencia (English language:Adolescence) is a 1942 Argentine film directed by Francisco Múgica and written by Carlos A. Olivari. The film starred Pola Alonso and Ana Arneodo

Synopsis
A girl falls in love with a boy arrived from the United States and displaces her childhood sweetheart.

Release
The film premiered on 11 March 1942 in Buenos Aires.

Cast
 Pola Alonso
 Ana Arneodo
 María Arrieta
 Alberto Contreras
 Rufino Córdoba
 Alfredo Jordan
 Mirtha Legrand
 Ángel Magaña
 Federico Mansilla
 Domingo Márquez

External links 
 

1942 films
Argentine black-and-white films
Films directed by Francisco Múgica
Argentine comedy films
1942 comedy films
1940s Argentine films
1940s Spanish-language films